Tomar (Tomer)  is a surname of Indian origin, and may refer to:

 Alka Tomar (21st century), Indian wrestler
 Narendra Singh Tomar (born 1957), Indian politician
 Paan Singh Tomar, Indian soldier, rebel and athlete
 Rajiv Tomar (21st century), Indian wrestler
 Anangpal Tomar (11th century), Indian ruler
 Sandeep Tomar, Indian wrestler
 Shalivahan Singh Tomar, Indian ruler of Gwalior
 Dharmesh Singh Tomar, Indian politician
 Lajja Ram Tomar (1930–2004), Indian educationist
 Rambeer Singh Tomar (1970–2001), Indian army officer 
 Usha Rani Tomar (born 1969), Indian politician
 Ramesh Chand Tomar (born 1948), Indian politician
 Jitender Singh Tomar (born 1966), Indian politician 
 Shivani Tomar, Indian actress
 Man Singh Tomar, Indian ruler of Gwalior
 Joshua Tomar, let's player and voice actor

Surnames of Indian origin